Dejan Raičković (born 27 October 1967 in Titograd, SFR Yugoslavia) is a Montenegrin football manager and former football player.

Raičković in his playing career represented FK Sarajevo, Hannover 96, FC Carl Zeiss Jena, Rot-Weiß Oberhausen and Tennis Borussia Berlin and played 208 games in the 2. Fußball-Bundesliga.

References

External links 
 
 
 

1967 births
Living people
Footballers from Podgorica
Montenegrin footballers
Yugoslav footballers
Association football defenders
Yugoslav First League players
2. Bundesliga players
FK Sarajevo players
Hannover 96 players
FC Carl Zeiss Jena players
Tennis Borussia Berlin players
Rot-Weiß Oberhausen players
Montenegrin football managers
Tennis Borussia Berlin managers
Expatriate footballers in Germany
Montenegrin expatriate footballers
Serbia and Montenegro expatriate footballers
Serbia and Montenegro footballers
Serbia and Montenegro expatriate sportspeople in Germany
Montenegrin expatriate sportspeople in Germany